NIAS or Nias may refer to:

Organisations
 National Institute of Advanced Studies (India)
 Nordic Institute of Asian Studies; See Nordic Centre in Shanghai
 Netherlands Institute for Advanced Study
 Northern Ireland Ambulance Service
 Nederlandsch-Indische Artsen School, defunct Dutch East Indies medical school (1913-41)

Places
 Nias Island, an island off the western coast of Sumatra, Indonesia 
 Nias Regency, a regency in North Sumatra province, Indonesia

Other uses
 Nias-class gunboat
 Nias people
 Nias language
 Nickel Arsenide (NiAs) - a chemical compound of nickel and arsenic, constituent of Nickeline